The Big Tree is a nearly 400-year-old bur oak (Quercus macrocarpa) tree near the Missouri River in Boone County, Missouri. It is tied for National Champion, representing the largest tree of its species in the United States. Standing alone in the floodplain of the Missouri River, and near the city of Columbia, Missouri, it is a well-known landmark and has inspired artists, folklorists, photographers, and nature lovers for hundreds of years.

The land on which the tree grows is private, and has been farmed by the Williamson family for six generations, although it is publicly accessible by Bur Oak Road. The Katy Trail State Park, a popular rail trail, is just yards from the tree, making it a common side-trip for cyclists. The small village of McBaine is within sight of the tree, and the village of Huntsdale is nearby. It is part of the Lewis and Clark National Historic Trail. The Big Tree was cloned by scientists at the University of Missouri and many offspring from both clones and acorns are growing in front yards, city parks, and schoolyards around Missouri and beyond.

History
According to the U.S. Department of the Interior, the Big Tree is somewhere between 350 and 400 years old, having sprouted sometime in the 1600s. The tree was already around 200 years old when the Lewis and Clark Expedition passed nearby. The size of the tree has made coring and accurate dating difficult. It has been the state champion Bur Oak since 1987.

The tree has survived many droughts and floods, including the Great Flood of 1993, when water stood nearly 2 meters deep around its trunk. Lightning has struck the tree often, including in October 2020, when a strike lit a fire in the core, burning out a large space inside the tree. The fire was widely reported by the press and also attracted much community concern. The Boone County Fire Department arrived quickly and extinguished the blaze with great effort. Irrespective of the fire, the tree had been in decline for several years, due to age, drought, and flooding.

See also
Eagle Bluffs Conservation Area
Big Muddy National Fish and Wildlife Refuge
List of individual trees

References

External links
National Park Service “McBaine Burr Oak”
Atlas Obscura
Bike Katy Trail “Burr Oak Tree”

Individual oak trees
Individual trees in the United States
Flora of Missouri
Tourist attractions in Boone County, Missouri
Geography of Boone County, Missouri